The NESA Outstanding Eagle Scout Award (NOESA) is a distinguished service award of the Boy Scouts of America (BSA). It is awarded to an Eagle Scout by the National Eagle Scout Association for distinguished service to his profession and community upon the recommendation of his local BSA council NESA committee, Scout executive and council president.

The number of NOESA medals a council may present each calendar year is based upon the number of Eagle Scouts certified by the national office during the previous calendar year. Each council may present two awards if there were between one and 100 new Eagle Scouts from that council the previous year, plus one additional award for every additional 100 Eagle Scouts or portion thereof. A council is not permitted to carry unused nominations into the next calendar year, nor to "borrow" from the next year's allotment. The Distinguished Eagle Scout Award (DESA) is a similar distinguished award, but requires a tenure of twenty-five years as an Eagle Scout. NOESA is not required for the DESA award, but DESA recipients may not subsequently receive the NOESA.

Award
The award consists of a round silver medallion bearing an eagle in flight and the words "BSA NESA Outstanding Eagle Scout".  The medallion is suspended from a blue neck ribbon.  The recipient also receives a lapel pin miniature of the medallion and a square knot pin device for uniform wear.  The recipient is also presented with a certificate.

History
The NOESA was introduced during BSA's 100th Anniversary year with the first awards being made by the National Eagle Scout Association upon the recommendation of local council NESA Committees.  The award was created to recognize notable Eagle Scouts who had either performed their distinguished service closer to home (at the local, state, or regional level) or who were known nationally, but had not yet met the 25-year tenure as an Eagle requirement for the Distinguished Eagle Scout Award.

A quick analysis of the first seven year trends reveal that, while the award is succeeding and will quickly overtake the four decade older DESA, it is underutilized (and even unused entirely) by many local councils.  Since 2014, when quotas were increased to two (2) awards per year for councils with 1–100 Eagle Scouts the prior year, the minimum number of annual awards should be around 600, as there are just shy of 300 local councils as of summer 2016 (exact numbers are hard to track due to council mergers and divisions). This does not take into account councils like the National Capitol Area Council in MD/DC/VA and the Utah-based LDS-heavy Great Salt Lake Council and Utah National Parks Council, each of which can easily award 10 to 20 NOESAs per year due to their massive sizes. NESA's website list indicates that 67 current local councils have not presented any NOESAs through the first seven years of the program.

The first recipient of the NOESA (Serial #1) is Phil Smith, who received his Eagle rank in 1949 in Pennsylvania.

The council with the most NOESA recipients (through 2017) is the Utah National Parks Council #591 with 159 recipients, well ahead of the total of 88 received by second place National Capitol Area Council #082.  UNPC's total accounts for 8.2% of all NOESA recipients nationwide from inception through 2017.

Through 2016, only 16 recipients of the NOESA have gone on to receive the DESA.  The first was Wayne K. Stenehjem who received his NOESA in 2011 and his DESA in 2013.  Additionally, Larry A. Dale is the first (and to date only) to receive both awards in the same year, 2015.

At least four father/son pairs have received the NOESA, as well as five pairs of brothers.

Recipients

References

External links 
 

Advancement and recognition in the Boy Scouts of America